Bolles v. Outing Co., 175 U.S. 262 (1899), was a United States Supreme Court case in which the Court held under the Revised Statutes of the United States, someone seeking damages for copyright infringement is only eligible for damages from illicit copies found in the accused's possession. Copies already distributed are out of scope.

References

External links
 

1899 in United States case law
United States copyright case law
United States Supreme Court cases
United States Supreme Court cases of the Fuller Court